The Inland Scenic Route is a touring route in Canterbury, New Zealand. In the north, the route starts in Amberley and in the south, it ends at Orari Bridge where it meets State Highway 79 (SH 79). It is on the New Zealand Automobile Association's list of 101 things that "Kiwis must do". The Inland Scenic Route formed what used to be State Highway 72.

References

Roads in New Zealand
Tourist attractions in Canterbury, New Zealand
Scenic routes in New Zealand
Transport in Canterbury, New Zealand